Burinec is a village in Municipality of Struga, North Macedonia.

Population 
According to 'Debarski Glas', Burinec had 150 inhabitants in 1911.

As of the 2021 census, Burinec had 1 resident with the following ethnic composition:
Macedonians 1

References

Villages in Struga Municipality
Albanian communities in North Macedonia